Krantz Carlock Lefebvre is an album by Wayne Krantz released in 2009. "This trio's famously long residency at New York's 55 Bar used to be documented by downloadable recordings of the gigs the same night, and though the guitarist has access to a conventional recording studio here, he has kept the same improvisational live feel, augmenting it with some overdubbed theme statements and quirkily offhand vocals on four tracks. Krantz is accompanied by his regular partners, Tim Lefebvre (bass) and Keith Carlock (drums), and the bone-crunching three-way conversation they keep up joins the impact of a heavy rock power-trio to the harmonic sleight-of-hand and melodic slipperiness of a contemporary jazz band."

Track listing
All songs written by Wayne Krantz

 "It's No Fun Not to Like Pop"  – 5:45
 "War-Torn Johnny" – 5:38
 "Rushdie" – 3:59
 "Wine Is the Thread" – 5:48
 "The Earth from Above"  – 4:33
 "Left It on the Playground" – 9:01
 "Jeff Beck" – 4:17
 "I Was Like" – 3:05
 "Mosley" – 3:04
 "Holy Joe" – 2:52
 "Rugged Individual" – 6:33

Personnel
 Wayne Krantz – guitar, vocals
 Tim Lefebvre – bass guitar
 Keith Carlock – drums

References

Wayne Krantz albums
2009 albums
Abstract Logix albums